This is an episode list for the 1976 season of the astronomy TV show Jack Horkheimer: Star Hustler starring Jack Horkheimer. During this season, the show still had its original name, Jack Horkheimer: Star Hustler. The show's episode numbering scheme changed several times during its run to coincide with major events in the show's history.


1976 season

References

External links 
  Star Gazer official website
  First Script
 

Jack Horkheimer:Star Hustler
1976 American television seasons